Stump Creek is an unincorporated community in Jefferson County, Pennsylvania, United States. Stump Creek has a post office with ZIP code 15863.

References

Unincorporated communities in Jefferson County, Pennsylvania
Unincorporated communities in Pennsylvania